1890–91 in Scottish football was the 18th season of competitive football in Scotland.  This season saw the introduction of the Scottish Football League with ten teams competing.

League competitions

Scottish Football League 

Dumbarton and Rangers were declared joint champions after drawing a play-off game 2–2 at Cathkin Park, Glasgow on 21 May 1891. Renton started the season as members of the Scottish Football League, but were expelled for professionalism (the game was still officially amateur at this stage). Also, Celtic, Third Lanark and Cowlairs were all docked four points for fielding ineligible players.

Other honours

Cup honours

National

County

Edinburgh Exhibition 

The Edinburgh Exhibition Contest was held to coincide with the 112th International Exhibition held at Meggetland, Edinburgh.

Rather than a one-off tournament, a series of nine games were arranged. The Edinburgh Evening Dispatch newspaper awarded silver cups to the winners of each match.

All matches were played at the exhibition's sports grounds at Meggetland.

Scotland national team 

Key:
 (H) = Home match
 (A) = Away match
 BHC = British Home Championship

See also 
1890–91 Rangers F.C. season

Notes

References 

 
Seasons in Scottish football